Lebanon is an unincorporated community in Hardin County, Tennessee. Lebanon is located at the intersection of Tennessee State Route 69 and Tennessee State Route 421 east of Milledgeville.

References

Unincorporated communities in Hardin County, Tennessee
Unincorporated communities in Tennessee